Ohio's 78th House of Representatives district is located in Pickaway County, Ohio, Hocking County, Ohio, Morgan County, Ohio, Fairfield County, Ohio and small parts of Athens and  Muskingum counties, with the major population centers being Circleville, Ohio and Logan, Ohio, as well as several villages. District 78 is primary a rural district, but falls within the Columbus Metro area. The district's boundaries were last redrawn in 2012 and the seat has been held by Republican Ron Hood since its redistricting.

Representative history

2020 election 
Ron Hood (R–Ashville), who has served the District since 2013, was unable to re-run for the office because of term limits. Three Republicans filed for the primary contest, which Brian Stewart won by more than 40 points. Charlotte Owens, ran unopposed in the Democratic primary.

Candidates 

 Charlotte Owens (D) is a former high school teacher who earned a Doctor of Philosophy in Chemistry and is now involved in teaching at the Lancaster campus of Ohio University, Central Ohio Technical College, and Hocking College. She has served on the board of the Fairfield County Educational Service Center since 2012.

 Brian Stewart (R) is an attorney and two-term Pickaway County Commissioner. He had previously been elected to Village Council in Ashville, Ohio. Stewart served in the United States Army where he was deployed in the Iraq War in 2005.

Campaign Finance

Controversy 
Brian Stewart had been endorsed and financially supported by Ohio House Speaker, Larry Householder, during his primary campaign. A political action committee that also supported Householder also ran negative campaign advertisements against Stewart's primary opponents. On July 21, 2020, Householder was charged in a bribery scandal. Stewart announced the following day that he would donate Householder's donations to his campaign to local non-profit organizations. He received $13,292.35 from the Householder campaign, $1,000 from FirstEnergy who was also identified as being a part of the scandal, and $500 from Matt Borges, who was indicted as well.

Previous election results 2000 - present

2020

2018

2016

2014

2012

2010

2008

2006

2004

2002

2000

References

Ohio House of Representatives districts